Crangonyx hobbsi is a species of troglobitic amphipod in the family Crangonyctidae. It is only known from its type locality, which is "a well, 50 feet deep, 1.5 miles northeast of Chiefland, Levy Co., Florida". It is listed as a vulnerable species on the IUCN Red List.

References

Gammaridea
Cave crustaceans
Endemic fauna of Florida
Crustaceans described in 1941
Taxonomy articles created by Polbot